The 2011 Silverstone GP3 Series round was a GP3 Series motor race held on 9 and 10 July 2011 at Silverstone Circuit in Silverstone, United Kingdom. It was the fourth round of the 2011 GP3 Series. The race supported the 2011 British Grand Prix.

Classification

Race 1

Notes
 – Ten grid position penalty for Laine (ignoring yellow flag during free practice); the same penalty to Haryanto, Melker and Hylkema (causing collisions during Race 2 in Valencia).
 – Most drivers elected to start the warm-up lap with slicks. Due to increasing rain, several drivers pitted for wet-weather tyres from the warm-up lap.
 – Stöckinger was given a 30 seconds time penalty after the race for ignoring yellow flags.
 – Zimin was excluded from the race results because of forcing Laine off the track; Zimin was also suspended from Race 2.

Race 2

Standings after the round

Drivers' Championship standings

Teams' Championship standings

 Note: Only the top five positions are included for both sets of standings.

See also 
 2011 British Grand Prix
 2011 Silverstone GP2 Series round

References

External links
GP3 Series official website: Results

Silverstone
GP3 Silverstone
Silverstone GP3